Lin Meiqun (born 1948 in Indonesia) also known as Lin Mei Chun is a former international table tennis player from China.

Table tennis career
She won three silver medals in the World Table Tennis Championships. 

During the 1971 World Table Tennis Championships she won a silver for China in the Corbillon Cup (women's team event).

Two further silver medals were won in 1973 and 1975 in the women's doubles with Qiu Baoqin and Zhu Xiangyun respectively.

See also
 List of table tennis players
 List of World Table Tennis Championships medalists

References

1948 births
Indonesian female table tennis players
Indonesian people of Chinese descent
Indonesian emigrants to China
Living people
Chinese female table tennis players
World Table Tennis Championships medalists